Einkorn wheat (from German Einkorn, literally "single grain") can refer either to a wild species of wheat (Triticum) or to its domesticated form. The wild form is T. boeoticum (syn. T. m. ssp. boeoticum), the domesticated form is T. monococcum (syn. T. m. ssp. boeoticum). Einkorn is a diploid species (2n = 14 chromosomes) of hulled wheat, with tough glumes ('husks') that tightly enclose the grains. The cultivated form is similar to the wild, except that the ear stays intact when ripe and the seeds are larger. The domestic form is known as "petit épeautre" in French, "Einkorn" in German, "einkorn" or "littlespelt" in English, "piccolo farro" in Italian and "escanda menor" in Spanish. The name refers to the fact that each spikelet contains only one grain.

Einkorn wheat was one of the first plants to be domesticated and cultivated. The earliest clear evidence of the domestication of einkorn dates from 10,600 to 9,900 years before present (8650 BCE  to 7950 BCE) from Çayönü and Cafer Höyük, two Early Pre-Pottery Neolithic B archaeological sites in southern Turkey. Remnants of einkorn were found with the iceman mummy Ötzi, dated to 3100 BCE.

History 

Einkorn wheat commonly grows wild in the hill country in the northern part of the Fertile Crescent and Anatolia although it has a wider distribution reaching into the Balkans and south to Jordan near the Dead Sea.

The principal difference between wild einkorn and cultivated einkorn is the method of seed dispersal. In the wild variety the seed head usually shatters and drops the kernels (seeds) of wheat onto the ground. This facilitates a new crop of wheat. In the domestic variety, the seed head remains intact. While such a mutation may occasionally occur in the wild, it is not viable there in the long term: the intact seed head will only drop to the ground when the stalk rots, and the kernels will not scatter but form a tight clump which inhibits germination and makes the mutant seedlings susceptible to disease. But harvesting einkorn with intact seed heads was easier for early human harvesters, who could then manually break apart the seed heads and scatter any kernels not eaten. Over time and through selection, conscious or unconscious, the human preference for intact seed heads created the domestic variety, which also has slightly larger kernels than wild einkorn. Domesticated einkorn thus requires human planting and harvesting for its continuing existence.  This process of domestication might have taken only 20 to 200 years with the end product a wheat easier for humans to harvest. 

Einkorn wheat is one of the earliest cultivated forms of wheat, alongside emmer wheat (T. dicoccum).    Hunter gatherers in the Fertile Crescent may have started harvesting einkorn as early as 30,000 years ago, according to archaeological evidence from Syria. Although gathered from the wild for thousands of years, einkorn wheat was first domesticated approximately 10,000 years BP in the Pre-Pottery Neolithic A (PPNA) or B (PPNB) periods. Evidence from DNA fingerprinting suggests einkorn was first domesticated near Karaca Dağ in southeast Turkey, an area in which a number of PPNB farming villages have been found. One theory by Yuval Noah Harari suggests that the domestication of einkorn was linked to intensive agriculture to support the nearby Göbekli Tepe site.

An important characteristic facilitating the domestication of einkorn and other annual grains is that the plants are largely self-pollinating.  Thus, the desirable (for human management) traits of einkorn could be perpetuated at less risk of cross-fertilization with wild plants which might have traits – e.g. smaller seeds, shattering seed heads, etc. – less desirable for human management.

From the northern part of the Fertile Crescent, the cultivation of einkorn wheat spread to the Caucasus, the Balkans, and central Europe. Einkorn wheat was more commonly grown in cooler climates than emmer wheat, the other domesticated wheat.  Cultivation of einkorn in the Middle East began to decline in favor of emmer wheat around 2000 BC. Cultivation of einkorn was never extensive in Italy, southern France, and Spain. Einkorn continued to be cultivated in some areas of northern Europe throughout the Middle Ages and until the early part of the 20th century.

Taxonomy 
 
 syn.  (wild)

 
 syn.  (domesticated)

Einkorn vs. common modern wheat varieties 

Einkorn wheat is low-yielding but can survive on poor, dry, marginal soils where other varieties of wheat will not. It is primarily eaten boiled in whole grains or in porridge.

Einkorn, as with other ancient varieties of wheat, is grouped with "the covered wheats" as its kernels do not break free from its seed coat (glume) with threshing and it is, therefore, difficult to separate the husk from the seed.

Current use 
Einkorn is a popular food in northern Provence (France). It is also used for bulgur or as animal feed in mountainous areas of France, India, Italy, Morocco, the former Yugoslavia, Turkey, and other countries.

Nutrition and gluten 
Einkorn contains gluten and has a higher percentage of protein than modern red wheats and is considered more nutritious because it also has higher levels of fat, phosphorus, potassium, pyridoxine, and beta-carotene.

Genetics

Disease resistance 
The 1973 found Sr21s source to be on Tms 2AL chromosome, originally.

 Salt-tolerance gene 
Australian scientists have succeeded in breeding the salt-tolerance feature of T. monococcum'' into durum wheat.

Gallery

References

External links 

Ancient Grain Varieties in Archaeology

Wheat
Plants described in 1753
History of agriculture
Pre-Pottery Neolithic A
Wheat cultivars
Founder crops